Qalyan Saz (also Romanized as Qalyān Sāz) is a village in Seyyedan Rural District, Abish Ahmad District, Kaleybar County, East Azerbaijan Province, Iran. At the 2006 census, its population was 28, in 5 families.

References 

Populated places in Kaleybar County